Henderson the Rain King is a 1959 novel by Saul Bellow. The book's blend of philosophical discourse and comic adventure has helped make it one of his more popular works.

The novel is said to be Bellow's favorite among his books. It was ranked number 21 on Modern Library's list of the 100 Best Novels in the English language.

Plot
Eugene Henderson is a troubled middle-aged man. Despite his riches, high social status, and physical prowess, he feels restless and unfulfilled, and harbors a spiritual void that manifests itself as an inner voice crying out "I want, I want, I want." Hoping to discover what the voice wants, Henderson goes to Africa.

Upon reaching Africa, Henderson splits with his original group and hires a native guide, Romilayu.  Romilayu leads Henderson to the village of the Arnewi, where Henderson befriends the leaders of the village. He learns that the cistern from which the Arnewi get their drinking water is plagued by frogs, thus rendering the water "unclean" according to local taboos. Henderson attempts to save the Arnewi by ridding them of the frogs, but his enthusiastic scheme ends in disaster, destroying the frogs and the village's cistern.

Henderson and Romilayu travel to the village of the Wariri. Here, Henderson impulsively performs a feat of strength by moving the giant wooden statue of the goddess Mummah and unwittingly becomes the Wariri Rain King, Sungo. He quickly develops a friendship with the native-born but western-educated King Dahfu, with whom he engages in a series of far-reaching philosophical discussions.

The elders send Dahfu to find a lion, which is supposedly the reincarnation of the late king, Dahfu's father. The lion hunt fails, and the lion mortally wounds the king. Henderson learns shortly before Dahfu's death that the Rain King is the next person in the line of succession for the throne. Having no interest in being king and desiring only to return home, Henderson flees the Wariri village.

Although it is unclear whether Henderson has truly found spiritual contentment, the novel ends with an optimistic and uplifting note.

Discussion
Henderson learns that a man can, with effort, have a spiritual rebirth when he realizes that spirit, body and the outside world are not enemies but can live in harmony.

A week before the novel appeared in book stores, Saul Bellow published an article in the New York Times titled “The Search for Symbols, a Writer Warns, Misses All the Fun and Fact of the Story.” Here, Bellow warns readers against looking too deeply for symbols in literature. This has led to much discussion among critics as to why Bellow warned his readers against searching for symbolism just before the symbol-packed Rain King hit the shelves.
 
The ongoing philosophical discussions and ramblings between Henderson and the natives, and inside Henderson's own head, prefigure elements of Bellow's next novel Herzog (1964), which includes many such inquiries into life and meaning.

As in all Bellow's novels, death figures prominently in Henderson the Rain King. Also, the novel manifests a few common character types that run through Bellow's literary works. One type is the Bellovian Hero, often described as a schlemiel.  Eugene Henderson, in company with most of Bellow's main characters, can be given this description, in the opinion of some people. Another is what Bellow calls the "Reality-Instructor"; in Henderson the Rain King, King Dahfu fills this role.  In Seize the Day, the instructor is played by Dr. Tamkin, while in Humboldt's Gift, Humboldt von Fleisher takes the part.

Scholars such as Bellow biographer James Atlas and others have shown that quite a few passages and ideas were lifted from a book titled The Cattle Complex in East Africa (1926) written by Bellow's anthropology professor Melville Herskovits who supervised his senior thesis at Northwestern University in 1937.

Pulitzer Prize
In 1960, the Pulitzer Prize committee for fiction recommended Henderson the Rain King be awarded the prize for that year. The Pulitzer board, which have final say over the awarding of the prize, overrode their recommendation and chose Advise and Consent by Allen Drury.

Other media 
 Leon Kirchner adapted Henderson the Rain King into the libretto for his opera Lily, which premiered at the New York City Opera in the spring of 1977.  It was not a success, and was Kirchner's only foray into opera.
 "Rain King" is a song by Terence Boylan from his 1977 album Terence Boylan. It is clearly based on Bellow's novel.
 "Rain King" is a song by Counting Crows from their 1993 album August and Everything After. Henderson the Rain King and its characters were an inspiration in the song's writing. 
 One passage in the novel inspired Joni Mitchell to write the song "Both Sides, Now" in 1967.
 Henderson the Rain King was mentioned as the favorite book of the character Ally McBeal in season 1, episode 3 of Ally McBeal, titled "The Kiss."

References 

1959 American novels
Novels set in Africa
Novels by Saul Bellow
Viking Press books
Novels adapted into operas